OPT or Opt may refer for:

Computing 
 /opt, a directory in the Filesystem Hierarchy Standard
 Option key, a modifier key on Apple keyboards
 Optimal page replacement algorithm, a page replacement algorithms for swapping out pages from memory

Other uses 
 Occupied Palestinian territories, another name for the Palestinian territories of the West Bank and Gaza Strip
 Ocean Power Technologies, a US owned renewable energy company
 Office national des postes (disambiguation)
 Operation Prime Time, a consortium of TV Stations to provide alternative prime time programming
 Optical projection tomography, a form of tomographic tissue imaging used in biomedical research
 Optional Practical Training, a period during which university students with an F-1 are permitted by the United States Citizenship and Immigration Services (USCIS) to work for one year on a student visa without needing an H-1B
 Optimized Production Technology, a production planning system created by Eliyahu M. Goldratt
 Outdoor Payment Terminal, a name sometimes used for the self-service user interface hardware at fuel stations
 Oral pressure therapy, a treatment for obstructive sleep apnea
 Overseas Passenger Terminal, Sydney
 Obshchestvennoye Rossiyskoye Televideniye (ОРТ in Cyrillic script), the former name of Channel One Russia, a public broadcaster in Russia
 Oxford Placement Test

See also 
 Opt-out, to avoid receiving unsolicited product or service information
 Opting out, a political expression in Canada, describing the intention of a province to remove itself from a program administered by the federal government
 Opt in email, the option to receive bulk e-mail
 ORT (disambiguation), an acronym in Russian and Greek which appears like OPT